Kondepadu is a medium-sized village with a population of  around 2500, located in the Guntur district of Andhra Pradesh, India.

References

Villages in Guntur district